Saniabad (also Romanized as S̄ānīābād and Sonnīābād; also known as Sunnīābād) is a village in Miankuh Rural District, in the Central District of Mehriz County, Yazd Province, Iran. At the 2006 census, its population was 60, in 19 families.

References 

Populated places in Mehriz County